St. Mary's Convent School, Dewas (MP) is a co-ed day school providing public school education up to the senior secondary level (Class 12). The institution is administered and run by the Franciscan Sisters of St. Mary of the Angels (FSMA), a religious charitable institute which has established several flourishing schools in the country.

History
The school reports having a lowly beginning back in July 1968 when it started in the out houses of the then-Maharaja of Dewas. Dewas was an insignificant village at that time and had not developed to its current status. The founders, Sr. Bernadette and Sr. Rosalia used to commute by bus from Ujjain, walking the residual distance to the palace ground with all the teaching accessories. As the number of students on the roll kept growing it became imperative to put up a school building. Fr. Reckwordt SVD supervised the planning and construction of the new school building on the Ujjain–Dewas road to which the school was shifted in 1971. In the span of 49 years since its establishment, the institute has contrived to teach thousands of students. Since its inception the school has acquired a high reputation among others of the present city.

Overview
The school is run by the Francisian Sisters of St. Mary of the Angels (FSMA), a religious charitable institute that has established several flourishing schools in the country. It is a co-ed school, recognized and affiliated to the Central Board of Secondary Education.
The school may be entered at Kindergarten or Nursery level.

Facilities
 Smart 'Technology Empowered Classrooms'
The school has interactive computer-aided teaching through Smart Class using screens with a Smart Assessment System (SAS) in all the classes. SAS is a tool that allows teachers to assess and immediately evaluate their students' learning. The system is designed so that the students answer single and multiple-choice questions. The data are stored and the teacher can generate a wide range of reports with respect to each individual student. Through the Smart Class program teachers use digital resources such as animation, videos, diagrams, maps, graphs, and models, while teaching the chosen topic in the classroom.
 Seminar Hall/Auditorium
The auditorium is equipped with presentation tools and is a venue for recurring seminars and conferences.

Notable alumni
 Neha Hinge, Femina Miss India International in 2010

Gallery

References

External links
 Official Website

Franciscan high schools
Primary schools in India
Christian schools in Madhya Pradesh
High schools and secondary schools in Madhya Pradesh
Schools in Dewas
Educational institutions established in 1968
1968 establishments in Madhya Pradesh